The Players are an American R&B band of the 1960s on the Minit Records label produced by Cal Carter. They had a hit with "He'll Be Back" in 1966, and issued an album of the same name in the same year.

Discography
"He'll Be Back" (C. Gordon, J. Thomas) / B: "I Wanna Be Free", 1966 
"I'm Glad I Waited" (Al Smith) / B: "Why Did I Lie", 1966
"That's the Way" (Jimmy Georgantones) / B: "There's Got to Be a Way", 1967
"Get Right" (Robert Dobyne, Charles Jones) / B: "I'm So Alone", 1967

References

American rhythm and blues musical groups